Kushanshahr was a province of the Sasanian Empire comprising the region between Kabul Valley and Peshawar Valley. The Kushanshar territory centered on Tukharistan, and covered the area from Tirmidh to Peshawar. The establishment of Sasanian rule in Kushanshar permitted the control of Central Asian trade routes. The Kushano-Sasanids were in charge of the area. They issued coinage which was following the Kushan standard, due to the traditional importance of trade links with India.

Kushanshahr was a pendant to Eranshahr to the West, which was the cradle of the Sasanian Empire.

Sasanian rule ended in Kushanshahr when the area was overrun by the Kidarites and then the Hephthalites.
.

References

Sources
 

Provinces of the Sasanian Empire
Ancient history of Afghanistan